The Eurasian Patent Organization (EAPO) is an international organization set up in 1995 by the Eurasian Patent Convention (EAPC) to grant Eurasian patents. The official language of the EAPO is Russian and its current president is Saule Tlevlessova. The headquarters of the EAPO is in Moscow, Russia.

Membership and signatories

Member states 
As of February 2021, the following 8 countries are contracting states to the EAPC and therefore members of the Eurasian Patent Organization:

Former members 
Moldova is a former member state of the Eurasian Patent Organization. On 26 October 2011, Moldova denounced the Eurasian Patent Convention, meaning that, since 26 April 2012, it is no longer party to the Convention. In December 2011, negotiations on a "validation and co-operation agreement" between the European Patent Office (EPO) and Moldova were authorized by the Administrative Council of the European Patent Organisation. The validation agreement with Moldova took effect on 1 November 2015. 

Although Moldova left the Eurasian Patent Organization, the Intellectual Property Agency of Moldova signed a Cooperation Agreement between Moldova and the Eurasian Patent Office in 2017.

Signatories that did not become members 
Although Ukraine and Georgia were original signatories to the Eurasian Patent Convention, they have not ratified it.

In 2019, negotiations between the European Patent Office (EPO) and Georgia were expected to result in a validation agreement, similar to the one existing between the EPO and Moldova.

International cooperation 
The EAPO cooperates with other patent organizations and has signed memorandums of understanding with the following:
 African Regional Intellectual Property Organization
 European Patent Office 
 European Union Intellectual Property Office
 Korean Intellectual Property Office
 World Intellectual Property Organization

PPH programme 

The Patent Prosecution Highway Programme (PPH Programme) constitutes bilateral agreements between the Eurasian Patent Office and other patent offices designed to provide applicants with opportunities to get a patent faster and more efficiently, in one of the participating patent offices. The programme allows for an accelerated examination of patents compared to applications from non-participating patent offices. Currently, partner offices participating in the programme include the Japan Patent Office, European Patent Office, China National Intellectual Property Administration, Korean Intellectual Property Office, and the Finnish Patent and Registration Office.

Exchange of patent documentation 
In addition, according to its own web site, the EAPO maintains various agreements on the exchange of patent documentation with 38 countries across Asia, Europe, and North America.

See also 
 European Patent Organisation
 Outline of patents
 Patent offices in Europe
 Trilateral Patent Offices

References

External links 
 

Patent offices
Patent law treaties
Intellectual property law in Europe
Intellectual property law in Asia
Commonwealth of Independent States
Post-Soviet alliances
Eurasia
Multilateral relations of Russia
Organizations established in 1995